Events from the year 1716 in art.

Events
 A sculpture park begins to be established in the Summer Garden at Saint Petersburg, Russia.

Paintings
 Sir Godfrey Kneller – Portrait of Caroline of Brandenburg-Ansbach, Princess of Wales
 James Thornhill – hall ceiling at Blenheim Palace, Oxfordshire
 Adriaen van der Werff – The Judgement of Paris (approximate date)

Births
 March 19 – Guillaume Coustou the Younger, painter (died 1777)
 March 25 – Alexei Antropov, Russian barocco painter (died 1795)
 April 5 – Jeremiah Theus, Swiss-born American painter, primarily of portraits (died 1774)
 June 18 – Joseph-Marie Vien, French painter (died 1809)
 December 1 – Étienne Maurice Falconet, French Rococo sculptor (died 1791)
 date unknown
 Fedor Leontyevich Argunov, Russian painter (died 1754)
 Yosa Buson, Japanese poet and painter from the Edo period (died 1784)
 Jacques Fabien Gautier d'Agoty, French painter and printmaker (died 1785)
 Luis Egidio Meléndez, Spanish still-life painter (died 1780)
 Johann Georg Ziesenis, German-Danish portrait painter (died 1776)
 probable
 Bartolomeo Cavaceppi, Italian sculptor who worked in Rome (died 1799)
 Christian Ulrik Foltmar, Danish wallpaper weaver, painter of miniatures and organist (died 1794)

Deaths
 February 3 – Giuseppe Alberti, Italian painter (born 1664)
 March 15 - Gilliam van der Gouwen, Flemish engraver (born 1657)
 March 22 – Philippe Lallemand, French portrait painter (born 1636)
 April 23 – Justus van Huysum, Dutch Golden Age flower painter (born 1659)
 June 2 – Ogata Kōrin, Japanese painter and lacquerer (born 1658)
 August 5 – Teresa del Po, Italian painter and engraver (born 1649)
 September 19 – Louis Du Guernier, French engraver (born 1677)
 November 16 – Pierre Lepautre, French  (designer of ornament) and engraver (born 1648)
 December 13 – Charles de La Fosse,  French painter (born 1640)
 December 18 – Jan Van Cleef, Flemish painter (born 1646)
 date unknown
 Philippe Caffieri, Italian decorative sculptor (born 1634)
 Giovanni Canti, Italian painter (born 1650)
 Juan Correa, Mexican painter of primarily religious themes (born 1646)
 Stefano Erardi, Maltese painter (born 1630)
 Garret Morphy, Irish painter of portraits, genre scenes and landscapes (born 1650)
 Sante Vandi, Italian portrait painter (born 1653)

References

 
Years of the 18th century in art
1710s in art